Kevin Matthew Gilbert (also known as Matthew Delgado and Kai Gilbert; November 20, 1966 – May 18, 1996) was an American singer, songwriter, musician, composer and producer. He was best known for his solo progressive rock projects, Toy Matinee and his contributions to Tuesday Night Music Club, the debut album by Sheryl Crow.

Early life 
Kevin Matthew Gilbert was born in Sacramento, California, on November 20, 1966, later living in Scotch Plains, New Jersey and San Mateo, California, where he attended Abbott Middle School and Junipero Serra High School.

Career

1984–1989: Early years 
Kevin Gilbert was an accomplished composer, singer, producer and instrumentalist who played keyboards, guitar, bass guitar, cello, and drums. In 1984 he and Jason Hubbard released the eponymous No Reasons Given album. Between 1984 and 1987 he self-released four albums as Kai Gilbert.

He toured with Eddie Money before entering the 1988 Yamaha International Rock Music Competition with his progressive rock group Giraffe.  Although Giraffe placed 2nd (winner was the Australian rock band Janz), Kevin was considered the popular winner of the night. Producer Patrick Leonard was impressed with Gilbert's performance at the competition and invited him to join him in forming a new band which became Toy Matinee. During this time, Gilbert worked on the projects of several established pop musicians, including Madonna, Michael Jackson, and Keith Emerson, acting as producer for the latter's album Changing States.

1990: Toy Matinee 
The lone Toy Matinee album was released in 1990 but received no initial promotion or support from the record label. Minus Leonard, Gilbert assembled a new backing band to play live shows to promote the album. His efforts resulted in the release of two successful singles, "The Ballad of Jenny Ledge" and "Last Plane Out."

Tuesday Night Music Club 

Later, Gilbert was part of the songwriting collective "The Tuesday Music Club" that met at producer Bill Bottrell's studio in Pasadena, California. Gilbert introduced his then-girlfriend Sheryl Crow to Bottrell and his fellow Club musicians and the sessions allowed Crow to workshop new material, leading to the recording of her breakthrough debut album, Tuesday Night Music Club. Gilbert co-wrote many of the songs on that album, including 1995 Grammy Record of the Year "All I Wanna Do". Crow later acrimoniously split with most of the musicians in the collective and only producer Bottrell and drummer Brian MacLeod were involved in her follow-up album. Meanwhile, the remainder of the collective worked with singer-songwriters Susanna Hoffs and Linda Perry on two more albums.

1995: Thud and reforming Giraffe 

Gilbert continued to work in television and movie soundtracks (under the name Matthew Delgado), studio sessions, production, and eventually released his first solo album Thud (1995) as well as partially reforming Giraffe to perform the Genesis double album The Lamb Lies Down on Broadway at Progfest '94. Gilbert's manager sent a copy of the recording to Tony Banks and Mike Rutherford who were searching for a new front man to replace Phil Collins. Coincidentally, shortly after Gilbert's death, his manager, Jon Rubin of The Rubinoos, was contacted by Genesis's management to arrange an audition.

1999–2014: Posthumous albums 
On May 18, 1996, Gilbert was found dead at his home just outside of Los Angeles. The coroner listed the cause of death as "asphyxia due to partial suspension hanging" and concluded the death was accidental and not a suicide. This manner of death is known as autoerotic asphyxiation, and the Los Angeles County Coroner's Office reports four or five such deaths a year.

Several albums of Gilbert's music have been released posthumously, beginning in 1999 with the live album Kevin Gilbert & Thud – Live at the Troubadour (consisting primarily of songs from Thud) and a compilation of Giraffe material that he had been working on.

Gilbert's second solo album, The Shaming of the True, (2000) was also released posthumously. The album was largely incomplete, but Gilbert's estate asked Nick D'Virgilio (a former member of Thud, the Giraffe Progfest '94 gig, Spock's Beard drummer and close friend of Gilbert's) and producer/engineer John Cuniberti to complete it, based upon the extant tapes and the album planning notes left by Gilbert. Following this, an "industrial" album of music performed by Gilbert's group, Kaviar, was released in 2002. Nick D'Virgilio performed the entire The Shaming of the True album in concert twice, first at the ProgWest festival in 2002 and again at Whittier College in 2012.

In October 2009, three new works were released; Nuts and Bolts (collectively a body of mostly unreleased songs and mixes, released as two individual CD albums) and Welcome to Joytown – Thud: Live at The Troubadour, a DVD/CD which expanded on the original 1999 release. A live performance from Gilbert's promotional group for Toy Matinee was made available in March 2010, and late 2011 saw a deluxe expanded release of The Shaming of the True with additional orchestration and engineering by Mark Hornsby. In 2012, the two Giraffe albums and 1984's No Reasons Given were re-issued with complete re-mastering from the original analog tapes. Late 2014 saw a similar expanded release of Thud and a one-time vinyl pressing. A box set of the Giraffe albums and a DVD with video footage of the band and their performances was released in early 2021, and also a vinyl release of The Shaming of the True. A 4-CD box set of Gilbert's earlier work, Call Me Kai, was released later in the same year, along with a CD collection of cover songs Gilbert had recorded over the years.

Discography

Solo career 
 1984: No Reasons Given (with Jason Hubbard)
 1985: Decent Exposure (as Kai Gilbert)
 1986: Sometimes Why (as Kai Gilbert)
 1987: Point Blank (as Kai Gilbert)
 1987: Mixed Bag (as Kai Gilbert)
 1995: Thud
 1999: Welcome to Joytown – Thud: Live at The Troubadour (with Thud)
 2000: The Shaming of the True
 2009: Nuts
 2009: Bolts
 2021: Covers (Compilation)
 2021: Call Me Kai (Compilation)

With other artists 
 1990: Toy Matinee (with Toy Matinee)
 1991: EE Ticket (with Marc Bonilla)
 1993: Tuesday Night Music Club (with Sheryl Crow)
 1993: American Matador (with Marc Bonilla)
 1995: Supper's Ready – A Tribute To Genesis (various artists)
 1995: Tales From Yesterday – A Tribute To Yes (various artists)
 1997: Giant Tracks – A Tribute To Gentle Giant (various artists)
 2002: The Kaviar Sessions (with Kaviar; recorded 1996)
 2010: Toy Matinee Acoustic (with Toy Matinee)
 2010: Kevin Gilbert Performs Toy Matinee Live (with Toy Matinee)

With Giraffe 
 1987: The Power of Suggestion
 1988: The View From Here
 1999: Giraffe (compilation)
 2021: Giraffe (compilation)

As composer

Films

Television

References

External links 
Official Kevin Gilbert website

Kevin Gilbert discography at Discogs
Official Kevin Gilbert YouTube channel

1966 births
1996 deaths
Musicians from Sacramento, California
Accidental deaths in California
American rock singers
20th-century American singers
American rock songwriters
American male singer-songwriters
Deaths from asphyxiation
Singer-songwriters from California
20th-century American male singers
Junípero Serra High School (San Mateo, California) alumni
Deaths by autoerotic asphyxiation